Doig is an unincorporated community in northern Alberta, Canada. It is located in Clear Hills County, in a muskeg and boreal forest landscape. 

The Doig Airport  is located here.

It was named after the Doig River, a tributary of Beatton River. The middle Triassic bituminous Doig Formation was named after this place.

Clear Hills County